Palais Royale is a residential supertall skyscraper project in Worli, Mumbai, India. At , it is the tallest building and third tallest structure in India.

The building sits on land previously owned by Shree Ram Mills Ltd. Permits for construction were granted in 2005, and construction began in 2008. The project's progress has been stalled due to multiple public interest litigation lawsuits filed by NGOs Janhit Manch and UHRF, Delhi. These litigations were disposed of by the Supreme Court of India in October 2019. In its judgement, the Court observed that the lawsuits lacked consistency and bonafides. The promoters of the project have contended the lawsuits to be motivated and sponsored by private interests of rival builder Mufatraj Munot of Kalpataru Builders. 

The site was put up for auction in May 2019 without any buyers. Another auction was held in mid 2019, and the incomplete site was bought by a company named Honest Shelters for  705 crore.

See also
 List of tallest buildings in India
 List of tallest buildings in Mumbai
 List of tallest buildings in the world
 List of tallest buildings and structures in the Indian subcontinent
 List of tallest residential buildings

References

Buildings and structures under construction in India
Residential skyscrapers in Mumbai